Denson also known as Bear Island is an unincorporated community in Livingston Parish, Louisiana, United States.

History
A man named Callie Denson Moore founded the local post office and was appointed postmaster on June 8, 1903.

References

Unincorporated communities in Livingston Parish, Louisiana
Unincorporated communities in Louisiana